= Articulationes cinguli membri =

Articulationes cinguli membri may refer to:

- Articulationes cinguli membri inferioris
- Articulationes cinguli membri superioris
